Harby is the easternmost village in the English county of Nottinghamshire. The nearest city is Lincoln, over the border in Lincolnshire. According to the 2011 census, it had a population of 336, up from 289 at the 2001 census.

Heritage

Eleanor of Castile
The parish church of All Saints' was built in 1875–1876 in Early English style. In the east wall of the tower is a statue in memory of Eleanor of Castile, Queen Consort of King Edward I of England. She died at the nearby house of Richard de Weston on 28 November 1290. The moated site of Weston's house is to the west of the church. The Queen's body was transported to London for burial. The King ordered Eleanor crosses to be built at each place where her body had rested overnight on the journey.

Windmills
The capless stump of a five-storey tower windmill, built about 1877, stands at the end of Mill Field Close. A post mill was also recorded for Harby.

Parish change
Harby was a township in the parish of North Clifton. It became a separate parish in 1866.

Education and amenities
The village is served by Queen Eleanor Primary School. There is a term-time school bus from Harby to Tuxford Academy.

A pre-booking bus service No. 67 of about three services a day serves Newark, Collingham and Saxilby on Mondays to Saturdays. The nearest railway station is at Saxilby on the Doncaster–Lincoln line.

The village has a playing field with a bowls club and a children's play park. The village hall has two rooms for hire to groups, courses and circles. There is another room for hire at the local pub, the Bottle and Glass, which also serves food. Residents can rent allotments from the parish council. There are no permanent retail shopping facilities in the village.

References

Villages in Nottinghamshire
Civil parishes in Nottinghamshire
Newark and Sherwood